Fidelis C. Obikwu (born 1960), is a male former athlete who competed for England.

Athletics career
Obikwu was a National champion after winning the 1982 AAA National Championships in the decathlon.

He represented England and won a bronze medal in the decathlon, at the 1982 Commonwealth Games in Brisbane, Queensland, Australia.

References

1960 births
English male athletes
Athletes (track and field) at the 1982 Commonwealth Games
Commonwealth Games medallists in athletics
Commonwealth Games bronze medallists for England
Living people
English decathletes
Medallists at the 1982 Commonwealth Games